The Girl of My Heart is a 1920 American silent adventure-drama film directed by Edward LeSaint and starring Shirley Mason, Raymond McKee and Martha Mattox.

Cast
 Shirley Mason as Joan
 Raymond McKee as Rodney White
 Martha Mattox as Prudence White
 Al Fremont as Major Philips
 Cecil Van Auker as Dr. Norman
 Calvin Weller as Mona
 Hooper Toler as Chawa
 Alfred Weller as Pedro

References

Bibliography
 Solomon, Aubrey. The Fox Film Corporation, 1915-1935: A History and Filmography. McFarland, 2011.

External links
 

1920 films
1920 drama films
1920s English-language films
American silent feature films
Silent American drama films
American black-and-white films
Films directed by Edward LeSaint
Fox Film films
1920s American films
1920 adventure films
Silent adventure drama films
American adventure drama films